Bear Creek is a stream in the U.S. state of Wisconsin. It is a tributary to the Little Eau Pleine River.

Bear Creek was so named on account of bears near its course.

References

Rivers of Wisconsin
Rivers of Marathon County, Wisconsin
Rivers of Wood County, Wisconsin